is a Japanese professor specializing in the history and cultural anthropology of Central Asia and Mongolia.

Biography
Konagaya completed a bachelor's degree in 1981 and a master's degree in 1983, both at Kyoto University. From 1987 to 2004 she held research positions, and a professorship, at the National Museum of Ethnology.

Publications 

 Konagaya, Y., Lkhagvasu̇rėn, I., & Rossabi, M. (2011). Socialist devotees and dissenters: Three twentieth-century Mongolian leaders. Osaka: National Museum of Ethnology.
Konagaya, Y., Lkhagvasu̇rėn, I., & Rossabi, M. (2014). Mongolia's transition from socialism to captitalism: Four views. Suita-shi: Kokuritsu Minzokugaku Hakubutsukan, Heisei 26.
Konagaya, Y. (2016). Northeast Asian borders: History, politics, and local societies. Osaka: National Museum of Ethnology.

References

Living people
People from Toyonaka, Osaka
Kyoto University alumni
1957 births
Cultural anthropologists